KDAC (1230 AM) is a radio station broadcasting a classic hits format, simulcasting KUKI 1400 AM Ukiah. Licensed to Fort Bragg, California, United States. The station is currently owned by Bicoastal Media Licenses, LLC.

History
KDAC began broadcasting in 1948 on 1230 kHz with 250 watts power (full-time). The licensee was Mendocino Coast Broadcasting Company.

References

External links

DAC
Classic hits radio stations in the United States